Sekolah Menengah Kebangsaan Kepong (English: Kepong National Secondary School), is a public secondary school located in Kuala Lumpur, Malaysia. It was established in 1965.

1965 establishments in Malaysia
Educational institutions established in 1965
Secondary schools in Kuala Lumpur